The Aeronca 12AC Chum was a 2-seat cabin monoplane designed and produced by Aeronca in the United States in 1946. The design was a licence-built version of the ERCO Ercoupe.

Aeronca built two examples, the first with the standard twin-tail and a second with a single tail, modified landing gear and all-metal wings.

Specifications (Chum)

See also

References

1940s United States civil utility aircraft
Low-wing aircraft
Single-engined tractor aircraft
Twin-tail aircraft